Seda Sayan (born Aysel Gürsaçer; 30 December 1962) is a Turkish pop folk singer, actress, and TV variety-show hostess.

Personal life 
Sayan was born in a poor family so she started working from a very young age. She started performing at the age of 16. She had her date of birth changed via a court decision in 1978 to 4 January 1959, in order to be eligible for performing at a specific venue. In December 2017, she changed her date of birth back to 1962. Her big shot came in 1984 when she played a role in a movie opposite Kadir İnanır.

In 1987, she married Rıdvan  Kılıç, a soccer player. The marriage did not last long and they divorced a few months later. She met Sinan Engin in 1989 and they later got  married. They had  their son Oğulcan Engin in 1990, but the couple divorced in 1995. Sayan was then in a relationship with Mahsun Kırmızıgül, a famous singer, for three years. In 2014, she was sentenced to a 5-year probation and a judicial fine of 6,000 liras for insulting Ankaralı Turgut. On 24 April 2022, she married musician Çağlar Ökten.

Discography
Albums
1985: Anılarım
1987: Seda Sayan'la Başbaşa
1989: Seviyor musun?
1990: 80'li Yıllar (featuring Nejat Alp)
1990: Ya Benim Olursun
1991: Git Demesi Kolay
1992: İşte Seda Sayan
1993: Yeter ki İste 
1994: Vız Gelir Her Şey 
1996: Ah Geceler 
1997: Sensizliğe Yanarım 
1999: Ben Sana Demedim mi? 
2001: Var Mısın?
2004: Sıkı Sıkı 
2005: Bebeğim
2007: Gecelerce Ağlarsın Unutma 
2009: Aşkla
2012: Seda Sayan 2012

EPs
2014: Hatıran Yeter
2017: Seni Seviyorum

Singles
2011: "İftira" (feat. Huseyin Karadayi)
2012: "Yağmur Altında Eriyorum"
2016: "Karagözlüm Ölesim Var"
2017: "Tabi Tabi" (feat. Yasin Keleş)
2018: "Milletin Duâsı" (with various artists)
2018: "Ah Geceler"
2019: "Son Sözüm"
2019: "Üzülme" (Aşkın'ın Şarkıları)
2019: "Keten Helva" (with Sergio Gürlek)
2020: "Düşerim"
2020: "Gerçekçi Ol" (with Ferat Üngür)
2021: "Gel Günaha Girelim" (with Alper Atakan)
2022: "Bak Gör"
2022: "Bin Dereden Su Getirsem"

Filmography

Film and TV series

TV programs
 Seda - Osman Show, Kanal 6
 Yetiş Bacım, TGRT
 Mahalleler Yarışıyor, TGRT (2000)
 Sabah Sabah Seda Sayan, Kanal D (2002)
 Seda Sayan ile Şans Kapısı, Kanal D
 Sabahların Sultanı Seda Sayan, Kanal D (2006–2009)
 Susma, Kanal D (2009)
 Yalnız Değilsiniz, Kanal D (2009)
 Sabahın Sedası, Show TV (2010–2011)
 Beyaz'ın Sultanı, Beyaz TV (2011)
 Seda Sultan, TV8 (2012–2013)
 Kaynana Gelin Seda'ya Gelin, Kanal D (2013–2014)
 Seda Sayan Show, Show TV (2014)
 Evleneceksen Gel, Show TV (2015–2017)
 O Ses Türkiye (Turkish version of The Voice), TV8 (2018–2020)
 Yemekteyiz (Turkish version of Come Dine with Me), TV8 (2019–2020)
 Seda Sayan'la Çılgın Sayısal Loto, TV8 (2020–2021)
 Gelinim Mutfakta, Kanal D (2021)
 Sabahın Sultanı Seda Sayan, Star TV (2022–)

References

External links 
 
 

1962 births
Living people
Singers from Istanbul
Turkish folk-pop singers
Turkish entertainers
Turkish women singers
Turkish pop singers
20th-century Turkish actresses
Golden Butterfly Award winners
Actresses from Istanbul